Andrija Radovanovic (born 31 may 2001) is a Serbian footballer who plays as a midfielder for Al Ain.

Career statistics

Club

Notes

References

External links

2001 births
Living people
Serbian footballers
Serbian expatriate footballers
Association football midfielders
UAE Pro League players
NK Domžale players
Al Ain FC players
Al-Ittihad Kalba SC players
Expatriate footballers in the United Arab Emirates
Serbian expatriate sportspeople in the United Arab Emirates
Footballers from Belgrade